Rhome Meadows Airport  is a privately owned public airport in Rhome, Wise County, Texas, United States, located approximately  north of the central business district. The airport has no IATA or ICAO designation.

The airport is used solely for general aviation purposes.

Facilities 
 Runway 13/31: 3,700 x 60 ft. (1,128 x 18 m), Surface: Turf

For the 12-month period ending 31 December 2015 the airport had 3,300 aircraft operations, an average of 9 per day: 100% general aviation. At that time there were 12 aircraft based at this airport: 92% single-engine and 8% ultralights, with no multi-engine, jets, helicopters, nor gliders.

References

External links 
  at Texas DOT Airport Directory

Airports in Texas
Airports in the Dallas–Fort Worth metroplex
Transportation in Wise County, Texas